Correa decumbens, commonly known as the spreading correa, is a species of prostrate to spreading shrub that is endemic to South Australia. It has narrow oblong to narrow elliptical leaves and narrow cylindrical, pink to red flowers with green lobes.

Description
The upper surface of the leaves is glabrous and the lower surface is covered with woolly, rust-coloured hairs. The eight stamens extend well beyond the end of the corolla. Flowering occurs between November and February as well from April to August in the species' native range.

Taxonomy
Correa decumbens was first formally described in 1855 by botanist Ferdinand von Mueller in Transactions and Proceedings of the Victorian Institute for the Advancement of Science from plants growing "on the cataracts towards Mount Lofty, and on the banks of the Onkaparinga in South Australia".

Distribution and habitat
Spreading correa occurs on the southern Mount Lofty Ranges where it grows in forest dominated by stringybark and on Kangaroo Island where it grows in forest dominated by sugar gum (Eucalyptus cladocalyx).

References

decumbens
Flora of South Australia
Taxa named by Ferdinand von Mueller
Plants described in 1855